Hoplolaimus magnistylus is a plant pathogenic nematode affecting soybeans.

See also 
 List of soybean diseases

References 

Tylenchida
Agricultural pest nematodes
Vegetable diseases